Evelyn Corliss White (born March 29, 1954) is an American writer and editor. Her books include the collection Black Women's Health Book: Speaking for Ourselves and the biography Alice Walker: A Life.

Early life and education 
Evelyn C. White was born on March 29, 1954 in Chicago, Illinois to Amanda Cantrells and Andrew S. White. She was one of five siblings. White grew up in a working class neighborhood in Gary, Indiana and attended Alain L Locke Elementary School.

After graduating from Wellesley College in 1976, she worked for a theatre company in Denmark. Returning to the United States, she studied theatre at the University of Washington and began writing professionally while living in Seattle. She graduated from Columbia University Graduate School of Journalism in 1985.

In 1991, White earned a Master's degree in public administration from Harvard University.

Career 
White joined the staff of the San Francisco Chronicle in the mid-1980s. She published her first two books, Chain, Chain, Change: For Black Women in Abusive Relationships and Black Women's Health Book: Speaking for Ourselves, with Seal Press, a small feminist press based in Seattle, Washington.

Black Women's Health Book included chapters from Audre Lorde, Alice Walker, and Toni Morrison. Writing for the New York Times, Linda Villarosa observed that some of the book's topics were "unavoidably depressing" but noted that "when the essays hit home, they hit hard". Publishers Weekly summarized the book's 41 different writings as covering "the vast spectrum of the black women's health experience as patient, healer and witness". In the San Francisco Chronicle Patricia Holt concluded that the book "breaks the silence, bursts the taboos, and mends many hearts along the way".

While White was teaching at a writing center in Oregon, one of her students brought her into contact with the novelist Alice Walker, who had read newspaper articles that White had written for the San Francisco Chronicle. After a decade of White's work on Walker's biography, Alice Walker: A Life was published by Norton in 2004, with The New York Times calling it a "rich, complex story" and Publishers Weekly describing it as a "vibrant narrative".

White currently lives in Halifax, Nova Scotia, Canada, and has contributed to publications like The Coast, The Nova Scotia Advocate, Halifax Examiner.

Bibliography

Honors 

 1985: Christopher Trump award for " The Racial Development of Blind Black Children" [master's thesis]

References

External links 

 Evelyn C. White papers at the Sophia Smith Collection, Smith College Special Collections

1954 births
Writers from Chicago
Wellesley College alumni
Columbia University Graduate School of Journalism alumni
Harvard Kennedy School alumni
African-American women journalists
African-American journalists
20th-century American women writers
21st-century American women writers
San Francisco Chronicle people
Writers from Gary, Indiana
Living people
20th-century American non-fiction writers
21st-century American non-fiction writers
20th-century African-American women writers
20th-century African-American writers
21st-century African-American women